Brayton Laster (born August 28, 2002), nicknamed The Pizza Man, is an American professional stock car racing driver. He competes part-time in the ARCA Menards Series, driving the No. 03 Ford Fusion for Mullins Racing.

Racing career

Early racing career 
Laster would start racing go-karts at the age of eight at the Indianapolis Speedrome. Four years later, he would move on to racing Ford Thunderbirds and other various types of stock cars. According to Laster's dad, Dane, he would describe Brayton's equipment as a Frankenstein-esque vehicle, saying that "There’s times where I look back and I feel bad about some of the stuff I put him in over the years. But he’s had to drive his heart out, he’s had to learn to work on it to get speed out of it."

For most of his career, Laster has driven the No. 13 along with green paint, both racing superstitions that are rumored to give bad luck. Laster said that he wanted both qualities as a satire to both superstitions.

ARCA Menards Series 
Laster made his ARCA Menards Series debut in 2022 in the Lucas Oil 200 at the Daytona International Speedway. Laster had a strong run, finishing 13th.

Camping World Truck Series 

On April 28th, it was announced that Laster will make his truck debut in the Corn Belt 150 at Knoxville with Reaume Brothers Racing.

Personal life 
Laster is nicknamed "The Pizza Man" for his love of pizza. According to Laster, he was self-proclaimed obsessed with pizza, which started with the Indianapolis Speedrome selling pizza for concessions. It then "became my identity", and he was reported wearing numerous clothes that looked like pizza throughout middle school, earning the nickname from teachers. The nickname eventually moved over to his racing career.

Laster currently is an online student at Liberty University.

Motorsports career results

NASCAR

Camping World Truck Series 
(key) (Bold – Pole position awarded by qualifying time. Italics – Pole position earned by points standings or practice time. * – Most laps led.)

ARCA Menards Series

References

External links 
 
Official Website

2002 births
Living people
ARCA Menards Series drivers
NASCAR drivers
Racing drivers from Indiana
Racing drivers from Indianapolis